Lassina Abdoul Karim Konaté (born 20 May 1987), known as Karim Lancina, is a Nigerien former professional footballer. He played either as a midfielder or as a left back.

Club career
On 29 March 2013, Lancina left Cotonsport Garoua from Cameroon and signed for Bulgaria A Grupa side PFC Lokomotiv Sofia.

In August 2013, he joined French Ligue 2 team FC Metz.

International career
Lancina was also a member of Niger national team amassing 50 appearances and one goal. He was called up to the 2012 and 2012 Africa Cup of Nations.

International goals
Score and result list Niger's goal tally first, score column indicates score after Lancina goal.

References

External links
 

1987 births
Living people
People from Niamey
Association football midfielders
Association football fullbacks
Nigerien footballers
Niger international footballers
Nigerien expatriate sportspeople in Libya
Nigerien expatriate sportspeople in Cameroon
Nigerien expatriate sportspeople in France
Expatriate footballers in France
Expatriate footballers in Libya
Expatriate footballers in Cameroon
2012 Africa Cup of Nations players
2013 Africa Cup of Nations players
Coton Sport FC de Garoua players
Sahel SC players
Al-Ittihad Club (Tripoli) players
FC Metz players
SAS Épinal players
ES Thaon players
Elite One players
Libyan Premier League players
Ligue 2 players
Championnat National players
Championnat National 3 players